Camp Wyandot (formerly known as Camp Fire USA Central Ohio Council, Inc.) is owned and operated by Camp Wyandot, Inc., a non-profit youth organization, based in Columbus, Ohio, USA. On April 30, 2013, Camp Wyandot  became an independent organization and is no longer affiliated with Camp Fire.

Camp Wyandot itself is located in the Hocking Hills region of South Central Ohio. Wyandot hosts resident camps during the summer, as well as user groups and environmental education groups during the spring and fall. It is accredited by the American Camp Association.

Location
Camp Wyandot is located in the Clear Creek Valley adjacent to Clear Creek Metro Park, part of Columbus Metro Parks system.

References

Wyandot
Buildings and structures in Hocking County, Ohio